The Smita Patil Memorial Award for Best Actress is an honour established in 1986 by the Priyadarshni Academy in memory of actress Smita Patil. It is awarded every other year to an Indian actress for her contribution to Indian cinema in the period prior to the ceremony, irrespective of a particular performance.

Recipients

Controversy
The choice of Katrina Kaif, who is not renowned for her acting abilities, for the award in 2016 met with wide criticism by both the press and the public on social networks. Columnist Sneha Bengani described her selection as "a grave insult to Patil" and further wrote that it "mocks all the previous recipients". Others defended the choice.

References

External links
Official site

Indian awards
Awards established in 1986
Awards for actresses